The Russian Giant may be an appellation of the following people:

Feodor Machnow (1878–1912)
Nikolai Valuev (born 1973), Russian politician and former professional boxer